Ida Malosi is a lawyer and judge from New Zealand. She is the country's first woman Pacific Island judge.

Early life 
Malosi was raised in Bluff and Invercargill in the South Island of New Zealand. Malosi's parents were immigrants from Samoa; her father, Tusi, worked on wharves and her mother, Jane, was a hospital cleaner.

Education 
Malosi earned a Bachelor of laws degree and a Bachelor of Arts in History from  Victoria University of Wellington.

Career 
In 1994, together with La-Verne King and Aliʻimuamua Sandra Alofivae, Malosi founded a law firm in South Auckland, a partnership of three Maori and Pacific Island women lawyers. In 2000 the law firm received the Auckland District Law Society’s EEO ‘Most Innovative’ award.

In 2002, Malosi was appointed to the Family Court. Since then, she has worked to implement culturally appropriate responses to youth offending, working with Māori Youth Court colleagues on establishing Rangatahi Courts and using this as a model for similar Pasifika Courts. In 2015, the Australasian Institute of Judicial Administration awarded the Rangatahi and Pasifika Courts its Award for Excellence in Judicial Administration.

From May 2013 to July 2014 Malosi served as Samoa's first Samoan female Supreme Court Judge. During her time in Samoa she established the Family Court and the Family Violence Court. She also began the work to found the Alcohol and Other Drug Treatment Court.

In 2017 Malosi was awarded Victoria University's Distinguished Alumni Award.

References

Living people
21st-century New Zealand judges
20th-century New Zealand lawyers
New Zealand people of Samoan descent
Victoria University of Wellington alumni
Year of birth missing (living people)
Samoan judges
Samoan women judges
21st-century women judges
Family Court of New Zealand judges